Kennedy Centre is a retail and leisure development in a largely built-up residential area in West Belfast. Having agreed upon a new anchor tenant, the Kennedy Centre was redeveloped again in 2009.

Retail stores 

Within the Kennedy Centre, there are currently 48 stores. Some of these stores include Iceland, Costa Coffee, Greggs and 26 West Bar & Grill. Other stores include Boots UK, Peacocks, O'Neills, DV8, JD Sports, CEX & Poundland. Post-remodelling, the Kennedy Centre now hosts a foodcourt in the upstairs area opposite the Omniplex cinema. A children's soft play area and cafe are also present on the first floor, known as Funky Monkeys. A Family Entertainment Centre was also opened facing the Foodcourt on the first floor. The Andersonstown Jobs and Benefits office is also located within the complex. In 2022, Home Bargains left the main building, moving to a large building next to Kennedy Centre in the same complex

Cinema 

On the first floor of the Kennedy Centre, there is an 8-screen digital cinema operated by Omniplex.

Sainsbury's 

In 2009, Sainsbury's became the new anchor tenant, replacing Curleys Supermarket which had been present since 1981. There is also a Sainsbury's petrol filling station on the site at the Kennedy Centre. In October 2017 Sainsbury's opened their largest Argos concession in Northern Ireland within their West Belfast store.

History 
The site was formerly a Lucozade factory, which Hugh Kennedy bought, developed and opened his supermarket, Curleys, in 1981 on the site. It was later redeveloped in 1991 by Kennedy as "Kennedy Centre".

References

Shopping centres in Northern Ireland